Harriet Bonface (born 26 January 1993) is a Malawian judoka, representing Malawi internationally in Judo Tournament in the Extra-lightweight (48 kg) event. She competed at the Zone 6 Youth Games, winning a bronze medal, as well as the 2019 African Games.

Bonface is the first Malawian judoka to qualify for the Olympic Games and she competed at the 2020 Tokyo Games. Competing in the 48 kg division, she lost to Brazil's Gabrielle Chibana in the round of 32.

Her home village is Chikowi, Zomba District.

References

Living people
1993 births
Malawian female judoka